Lester Pearson (June 27, 1909 – April 9, 1986) was an American Negro league outfielder in the 1930s.

A native of East St. Louis, Illinois, Pearson attended Lincoln University of Missouri and played for the St. Louis Stars in 1937. In 26 recorded games, he posted 34 hits with two home runs and 18 RBI in 120 plate appearances. Pearson died in Los Angeles, California in 1986 at age 76.

References

External links
 and Seamheads

1909 births
1986 deaths
St. Louis Stars (1937) players
Baseball outfielders
Baseball players from Illinois
Sportspeople from East St. Louis, Illinois
20th-century African-American sportspeople